Frumex may refer to:

 Frumex Corporation, producers of a commercial version of the traditional Mexican drink Tepache
 a trade name for the loop diuretic medication known generically as Furosemide